Hanuman Tibba is the highest mountain peak in Kangra district and lies on Dhauladhar Range in Himachal Pradesh, with an altitude of  above sea level. It lies to the Northwest of Manali and to the East of Solang. To the north of Hamuman Tibba, lies the Taintuka Pass and to the south lies Manali Pass. These Passes form the district boundary between the kangra District and Kullu District. It is a well known local peak, partly due to it resembling a steep pyramid, with its noted feature of steep vertical rise from its base camp site. Its west face has been a recent site to many attempts to climb through the “west spur”, a steep, technical, sustained rocky feature often exposed to winds and gnarly ice flutings. The Diretissima through this face and the north face- overall, is still unclimbed.

Some controversy initially surrounded  Werner Merkel Roth and fellow members (Mr.A.Azer Mr. Mir.

References

Mountains of Himachal Pradesh